Somalia competed at the 2020 Summer Olympics in Tokyo. Originally scheduled to take place from 24 July to 9 August 2020, the Games have been postponed to 23 July to 8 August 2021, due to the COVID-19 pandemic. It was the nation's tenth appearance at the Summer Olympics since its debut in 1972.

Competitors
The following is the list of number of competitors in the Games.

Athletics

Somalia received a universality slot from the World Athletics to send one athlete to the Olympics.

Track & road events

Boxing

Somalia received an invitation from the Tripartite Commission to send the women's featherweight boxer Ramla Ali to the Olympics.

References

Olympics
2020
Nations at the 2020 Summer Olympics